General Waller may refer to:

Bill Waller Jr. (born 1952), U.S. Army brigadier general
Calvin Waller (1937–1996), U.S. Army lieutenant general
Littleton Waller (1856–1926), U.S. Marine Corps major general
Littleton W. T. Waller Jr. (1886–1967), U.S. Marine Corps major general
William Waller (c. 1597–1668), English Army major general